Jamar Howard (born September 3, 1987) is an American football wide receiver for the Jacksonville Sharks of the National Arena League (NAL). He played college Football at the University of Cincinnati before transferring to the University of Central Missouri. He has been a member of the Tri-Cities Fever, Cleveland Gladiators, Edmonton Eskimos, Portland Thunder/Steel and Jacksonville Sharks.

Professional career

Tri-Cities Fever
After trying out for the New York Giants at rookie mini-camp, Howard finished the indoor football season with the Tri-Cities Fever of the Indoor Football League.

Cleveland Gladiators
He signed with the Cleveland Gladiators of the Arena Football League on November 8, 2012 for the upcoming 2013 season.

Edmonton Eskimos
On August 13, 2013, he signed with the Edmonton Eskimos of the Canadian Football League. He was released April 28, 2014.

Portland Thunder/Steel
On May 5, 2014, Howard was traded to the Portland Thunder by the Cleveland Gladiators. The Gladiators held his AFL rights after exercising his 2013 rookie option. Howard emerged as the leading receiver for the Thunder. After being the AFL's top receiver through the first 5 weeks of the 2015 season, Howard was placed on injured reserve with and MCL injury. On November 6, 2015, Howard was assigned to the Thunder for the 2016 season. On February 24, 2016, the Thunder changed their name to Steel.

Jacksonville Sharks
On April 25, 2016, Howard was traded to the Jacksonville Sharks for Duke Robinson. On May 31, 2016, Howard was placed on recallable reassignment.

Portland Steel
On June 1, 2016, Howard was claimed off reassignment by the Portland Steel.

Cleveland Gladiators
On July 6, 2017, Howard was assigned to the Gladiators.

References

External links
 Central Missouri bio 
 Arena Football Stats 

1987 births
American football wide receivers
Living people
College of the Sequoias Giants football players
Cincinnati Bearcats football players
Central Missouri Mules football players
Tri-Cities Fever players
Cleveland Gladiators players
Portland Thunder players
Portland Steel players
Jacksonville Sharks players